Jalla may refer to:

Jalla! Jalla!, a 2000 Swedish comedy film directed by Josef Fares
 Jalla (bug), an insect genus in the subfamily Asopinae

See also

Yalla (disambiguation)
Jalla Jalaluhu ('May his glory be glorified'), an honorific often said or written alongside Allah
"Jalla Dansa Sawa", a 2013 song by Behrang Miri